In computing, the Structure of Management Information (SMI), an adapted subset of ASN.1, operates in Simple Network Management Protocol (SNMP) to define sets ("modules") of related managed objects in a Management Information Base (MIB).

SMI subdivides into three parts:  module definitions, object definitions, and notification definitions.

 Module definitions are used when describing information modules. An ASN .1 macro, MODULE-IDENTITY, is used to concisely convey the semantics of an information module.
  Object definitions describe managed objects.  An ASN.1 macro, OBJECT-TYPE, is used to concisely convey the syntax and semantics of a managed object.
  Notification definitions (aka "traps") are used when describing unsolicited transmissions of management information.  An ASN.1 macro, NOTIFICATION-TYPE, concisely conveys the syntax and semantics of a notification.

Implementations 

 libsmi, a C library for accessing MIB information

References

External links 
 , Standard 58, Conformance Statements for SMIv2
 , Standard 58, Textual Conventions for SMIv2
 , Standard 58, Structure of Management Information Version 2 (SMIv2)

Network management
Data modeling